The 1955 Penn Quakers football team was an American football team that represented the University of Pennsylvania during the 1955 college football season. Led by Steve Sebo in his second year as head coach, the Quakers finished the season with a 0–9 record, matching their 1954 campaign. Penn was outscored 270 to 34 on the season, shut out five times, and scored more than seven points only once, in a 46–14 loss to No. 6 Notre Dame. By the end of the season, Penn had lost 18 consecutive games and had not won in 22 straight contests, dating back to a loss to Michigan on Halloween 1953.

Schedule

References

Penn
Penn Quakers football seasons
College football winless seasons
Penn Quakers football